Nihan is a Turkish female given name of Persian origin that means secret, hidden. People named Nihan include:

 Nihan Anaz (born 1979), Turkish basketball player
 Nihan Güneyligil (born 1982), Turkish volleyball player
 Nihan Kantarcı (born 1982), Turkish sport shooter
 Nihan Kaya, Turkish novelist
 Nihan Su, Turkish women's football manager and former footballer

See also
 Camp Nihan

References

Turkish feminine given names